Colin "Tich" Wesley (5 September 1937 – 5 March 2022) was a South African cricketer who played in three Test matches in 1960.

Wesley played first-class cricket for Natal from 1957 to 1966 as a middle-order batsman and left-arm spin bowler. He toured England with the South African team in 1960. His highest first-class score was 131, made after Natal followed on against the New Zealanders in 1961–62. His only century in the Currie Cup came in his last first-class season, when he captained Natal B against North Eastern Transvaal and made 120 in the first innings, the only century in the match.

He briefly returned to provincial cricket to captain the Natal team, which played under the name "C. Wesley's XI", in the first season of South Africa's domestic List A competition in 1969–70; they lost the final by two runs.

He owned Wesley's, a chain of tobacco stores in South Africa. He died at home in Johannesburg on 5 March 2022, at the age of 84.

References

External links

1937 births
2022 deaths
South Africa Test cricketers
South African cricketers
KwaZulu-Natal cricketers
South African Universities cricketers
Cricketers from Durban
South African businesspeople
White South African people